is a Japanese judoka. Yoshida won a bronze medal in the 57 kg competition, and silver medal in mixed team at the 2020 Olympics held in Tokyo, Japan.

Career
She won a silver medal at the 2017 World Judo Championships in Budapest.

In 2021, she won the gold medal in her event at the 2021 Judo World Masters held in Doha, Qatar.

References

External links
 
 

1995 births
Living people
Japanese female judoka
Sportspeople from Kyoto
World judo champions
Judoka at the 2020 Summer Olympics
Medalists at the 2020 Summer Olympics
Olympic bronze medalists for Japan
Olympic silver medalists for Japan
Olympic medalists in judo
Olympic judoka of Japan
21st-century Japanese women